Claude Vincent Godby Haines (17 January 1906 – 28 January 1965) was an English cricketer.  Haines was a right-handed batsman.  He was born in Bristol and educated at The King's School, Canterbury.  He was known by his nickname of Bob.

Having played for the Kent Second XI in 1924, Haines joined Glamorgan nearly a decade later, making his first-class debut for the Welsh county against Nottinghamshire in the 1933 County Championship.  He made eleven further first-class appearances for Glamorgan, the last of which came against Somerset in the 1934 County Championship.  In his twelve first-class appearances, he scored a total of 350 runs at an average of 19.44, with a high score of 59.  This score, which was one of two fifties he made, came against Sussex in 1933.  During World War II, Haines was the match secretary for the British Empire XI, and following the war he played three matches for Devon in the 1946 Minor Counties Championship.

He died at Lower Cwmtwrch, Glamorgan on 28 January 1965.  His father, Alfred, played first-class cricket for Gloucestershire.

References

External links
Bob Haines at ESPNcricinfo
Bob Haines at CricketArchive

1906 births
1965 deaths
Cricketers from Bristol
People educated at The King's School, Canterbury
English cricketers
Glamorgan cricketers
Devon cricketers